G&G Entertainment is a South Korean animation studio which creates animation for the domestic South Korean and Japanese anime markets. The main studio, which is credited as G&G Entertainment, is located in South Korea, while the Japanese subsidiary studio, which is credited as G&G Direction, assists the main studio and aids in getting outsource work from other Japanese studios. G&G Entertainment is known for its collaboration with the Japanese animation studio Gonzo, with which they have produced their most successful series to date, Kaleido Star. Increasingly, the studio is also seeking collaborations with Chinese studios, particularly for the creation of computer animation productions.

TV series

Original productions
Ragnarok The Animation (2004) (Collaboration with GONZO)
Mask Man (2005)
Lala's Star Diary (2007)
Tuktakman (2017)

Collaboration with Japanese studios
Kaleido Star (2003) (collaboration with GONZO)
Jinzo Konchu Kabuto Borg VxV (2006) (collaboration with Studio Comet) 
Kirarin Revolution (2006) (collaboration with Synergy SP)
Duel Masters Flash (2006) (collaboration with Synergy SP)

Collaborations with Chinese studios
Little Wizard Tao (2007) (collaborations with Motion Magic Digital Studios)

As a support (Overseas) studio for Japanese productions
SaiKano (2002) (digital paint)
ARIA The ANIMATION (2005) (secondary key animation, digital paint)
Jinzo Konchu Kabuto Borg VXV (2006)

Original video animations (OVAs)

Original productions
Sorry, I Love You (2006)
Bug Fighter (2007)

Theatrical  films

Original productions
Olympus Guardian  (2003)

As a support (Overseas) studio for Japanese productions
Pokémon Heroes - Latias & Latios (2002) (animation assistance)

External links
 G&G Entertainment Official Website

South Korean companies established in 2000
South Korean animation studios
Mass media companies established in 2000